The 2006 Air Force Falcons football team represented the United States Air Force Academy in the 2006 NCAA Division I FBS football season. The Falcons were coached by Fisher DeBerry, who announced his retirement following the conclusion of the season. They were a member of the Mountain West Conference. They finished the season 4–8, 3–5 in Mountain West play to finish in a tie for sixth place.

Schedule

Roster

References

Air Force
Air Force Falcons football seasons
Air Force Falcons football